Jamilya may refer to:
 Jamila (novel), a 1958 novel by Chingiz Aytmatov
 Jamilya (film), a 1968 Soviet drama film, based on the novel

See also
 Jamila  (disambiguation)